The 2017 Moldovan "A" Division was the 27th season of Moldovan football's second-tier league. A total of 13 teams competed in this division. Sheriff-2 Tiraspol were the defending champions. The season began on 14 July 2017 and ended on 25 November 2017.

Teams

Format

In the initial phase of the season, each of the thirteen teams play the other twelve teams one time. After 12 rounds, the league splits into two sections, a top six and a bottom seven, with each team playing all the other teams in their section once.

League table

Results

Matches 1–12
Teams play every other team once (either at home or away).

Matches 13–17
Teams play every other team once (either at home or away).

Top six

Matches 13–18
Teams play every other team once (either at home or away).

Bottom seven

Top goalscorers

References

External links
Divizia A - Moldova - Results, fixtures, tables and news - divizia-a.md

Moldovan Liga 1 seasons
2
Moldova 2